Panam  may refer to:

Panam (film), a 1952 Tamil film
Panam (money), a type of currency issued in South India
Pan Am, a former American airline
Pan Am (TV series), a 2011 television series
University of Texas–Pan American, an American university
Bainang County, or Panam, a county in Tibet
Panam, Afghanistan, a village in Afghanistan
Panam station, a metro station in Daejeon, South Korea
Panam Palmer, a character in Cyberpunk 2077

See also
Paname, informal name of Paris
Pan Am (disambiguation)
Pan-American (disambiguation)
Panem, a country in the fictional world of The Hunger Games
Panama (disambiguation)